John Jonathon Pratt (April 14, 1831June 24, 1905) was an American journalist and newspaper owner. He was the inventor of the first working typewriters sold to the public. He was born in South Carolina and lived in Alabama, making him a Confederate, which put him at a disadvantage initially in obtaining US patents. He temporarily lived in England, where he developed his typewriter invention and received British patent rights. He sold some of his typewriters in England as early as 1867, which were the first typewriters bought by the public.

Pratt's typing innovation was initially presented to London societies of engineers and scientists. Subsequently, it was reported in British and American magazines and journals. This was the inspiration for Christopher Sholes's typewriter, the Remington typewriter, and the Hammond Typewriter. Historians have given Pratt the designation of being the "grandfather" of the typewriter.

Early life 
John Jonathon Pratt was born at Union, South Carolina, on April 14, 1831. His father was a lawyer and a judge for over thirty years in South Carolina. His maternal grandfather was also in the legal profession. Pratt attended local public schools and graduated from Cokesbury college in 1849.

Mid life 
Pratt's first job in the early 1850s was as part-owner in the National Democrat newspaper in Centre, Alabama, where he worked as a printer's devil and reporter. In the late 1850s he served as the editor for the Gadsden Times newspaper. He also worked as a historian of Cherokee County, Alabama, during this time and became a victim of writer's cramp. This inspired him to see if he could make a mechanical device to replace the labor of handwriting.

Pratt put together a crude apparatus as early as 1860 for a device that would print letters on a piece of paper. This was done with a set of knitting needles that had wooden blocks attached to them, with a metal type letter attached to each of the blocks. The inked type letter would imprint onto a piece of paper when the knitting needles were manipulated accordingly. He developed this into a practical typewriter model in the spring of 1863 that would print letters automatically upon hitting keys.

Pratt had developed his early-version typing device into a rotating print wheel that hit the proper letter with a hammer when a certain piano-like key was struck by a person's finger. The metal wheel employed a small plate of rows bearing letter fonts. This was supported vertically and placed behind a sheet of paper. It provided the means whereby a small hammer struck the selected letter and left an imprint on the paper. The mechanism then moved the paper to make room for the next letter to be printed.

Pratt was a Confederate, being a citizen of Alabama and not capable of getting a patent for various reasons, including legal and financial. He decided to move to Glasgow and sold his slaves and property to finance the trip. With his wife he sailed to England in 1864 where he spent most of his spare time perfecting his typewriter. He called his typewriter the Pterotype, meaning winged type. Pratt's machine was given provisional protection by the British government in February 1864. He received English patent number 3,163 on December 1, 1866. With his invention of a practical and portable typewriter came the end of the experimental stage of typewriting machines. 

Pratt exhibited his typewriter in London in 1867 to the Royal Society of Arts, the Society of United Kingdom Engineers, and the Royal Society of Great Britain. He had two working models that he displayed in front of scientists and engineers. One of those models is in the British Museum. A descriptive paper was read by the inventor before the Society of Arts explaining its construction and usefulness. The article was published in 1867 in the London Engineering journal associated with the society. English periodicals at the time published reports about Pratt's typewriter. Pratt's description was reprinted in the American popular science magazine Scientific American on July 6, 1867. It was further described in another Scientific American article on August 10, 1872.

The 1867 Scientific American Pratt article describes in detail the function and process of Pratt's finger-operated machine. It goes on to say that typing would be one of the aspects of a future society. It points out that the advantages of such a device indicate that laborious pen writing and poor penmanship would soon become a thing of the past, and legible, crisply printed letters would become the general rule with the use of his machine. The machine also allows a person to record his thoughts twice as fast as writing them down using pen and ink. The article predicts that publishing would undergo a revolution as remarkable as that which happened by the global spread of the printing press. It goes on to predict that the weary process of learning penmanship in schools would be reduced to just the skill of knowing how to write one's own signature. Students would learn the talent of typing instead, like that of learning how to play the piano.

Pratt was the first to make practical working typewriters and sell them to the public. He sold several of his typewriters in 1867 in London. The first English ones sold for $15. Among his purchasers were the English scientist Charles Wheatstone and English physician Henry Bence Jones. Pratt returned to the United States in 1868 and obtained patent US81,000 for his typewriter. He sold his US version for $125.  That was considered expensive, as a horse-drawn carriage cost $40 to $70 at the time. The first U.S. typewriters that came into mass production by other companies were not available until after 1870. The Remington Typewriter Company's Sholes & Glidden typewriters with the QWERTY keyboard (Remington model No. 1 based on Pratt's typewriter) started to be produced in 1874. 

Pratt obtained a second patent, US267367A, in 1882 that became a Hammond Typewriter model. He sold those rights to James B. Hammond for a lump sum of cash and a $2,500 life annuity. Later in the 1890s, when he was in his sixties, he became an advisor and superintendent for their factory that manufactured these in Brooklyn, New York. The patent as recorded at the United States Patent Office describes the machine as having three rows of 36 different type letter symbols each letter character selected then accordingly to be printed. The paper that was being typed had a carbon sheet between it and the type letter selected from the type wheel that provided the necessary ink.

Typewriter description

Pratt was the first inventor of a typewriter in which a type wheel moved by levers manipulated the correct key to print the letter. He has been credited as the first to apply escapement to feed motion and trip-hammer action in a wheel or plate mechanism for a typewriter. He is also the first to use compound motion, thus utilizing several types on a wheel for printing action on a typewriter. Thomas Edison took Pratt's wheel idea a step further in technology and applied electricity to the movement of the wheel – the electric printing wheel of the stock market ticker tape machine.

Pratt claimed four essential mechanical operations that he devised that made his typewriter function properly. First, it was necessary to bring forward any one of a number of letters at the will of the operator in arbitrary succession to a common point, to be able to print with ink of some kind a colored legible character at that common printing point. Second, it was necessary to feed the paper across that common predesignated point so as to make proper intervals between the letters and words. Third, it was necessary to make the mechanical linkage bring the paper back to its start position in a quick, smooth fashion, which was done with a foot treadle. Fourth, these mechanics of returning to the start position also had to enter in a line space at the same time.

Pratt's machine, which he labeled the Pterotype, had other names besides type-writer. These later labels were "Patent Printer", "Mechanical Chirographer", "An Improvement in Printing Instruments for the Blind", "An Improved Hand Printing Device or Mechanical Typographer", and "A Machine for writing with type of printing on paper or other substance", among others. The name typewriter came from the 1867 Scientific American article that described Pratt's original English version as a "typewriting machine". Christopher Latham Sholes is the one who often used the word type-writer for his typewriting contraption, and that shorter version was the one that English-speaking users have accepted to call Pratt's machine.

Grandfather of the typewriter 
According to a booklet published by the Remington Standard Typewriter company, Sholes only talked over with his associates the idea of making a typewriter in 1868. They had not gone beyond making a machine that printed just page numbers. Carlos Glidden suggested to Sholes to make a machine that would also print letters and pointed out Pratt's 1867 typewriter as a possible way to do it. Sholes has been called the father of the typewriter, but Pratt's previous typewriter invention is generally credited as the inspiration for Sholes's machine. 

However, historian Beverly Crider asserts that since Pratt helped inspire Sholes to develop his typewriting machine in 1868, Pratt should be called the grandfather of the typewriter. Professors Louise Pettus and Ron Chepesiuk of Winthrop College report that it was Pratt's technical ingenuity that made possible the modern typewriter and therefore he should be designated grandfather of the typewriter. Both Encyclopedia Britannica and Scientific American give Pratt the credit for being the inventor of the typewriter and producing the first ones. National Cyclopedia says that if Sholes is called the 'father of the typewriter' then Pratt should be given the title of 'grandfather of the typewriter'.

Personal life 
In 1852, at the age of 21, Pratt married Julia Porter, the 21-year-old daughter of Judge Benjamin F. Porter of Alabama. They had two daughters, Stella and Juliet.

Pratt moved from Brooklyn to Chattanooga, Tennessee, in 1902. He died of acute indigestion and a weak heart at the age of 74 on June 24, 1905. He is buried at Pratt Cemetery in the Pine Knoll family plot that is located near Centre, Alabama. His wife was previously buried at the family plot in 1897. Both their daughters are also buried there.

Legacy
Pratt's typewriters can be found in the Victoria and Albert Museum of London and in the Smithsonian Museum in Washington, D.C. A Pratt Memorial Scholarship Fund was created by the Alabama State Federation of Business and Professional Women's Club in 1922. A memorial marker for Pratt was erected at his birth city in Union County, South Carolina, in 1913.

A letter typed at London in 1867 on one of Pratt's English typewriters is held in the office of the United States Commissioner of Patents. Letters from Pratt to his American family written while he was still living in England in 1867, talking about his typewriter's success there, and other personal letters and samples of Pratt's typewriter history memorabilia are held by the Alabama Department of Archives and History.

See also
Thomas Hall (mechanic) - invented the first portable typewriter.

References

Sources

External links

1831 births
1905 deaths
19th-century American newspaper editors
19th-century American inventors
People from Union, South Carolina
People from Cherokee County, Alabama
Editors of Alabama newspapers
Typewriters
American patent holders